Kansas is a midwestern state in the United States. Kansas may also refer to:

Places
 Kansas Territory, U.S. territory which existed from 1854 to 1861
 Kansas, Alabama
 Kansas, Georgia
 Kansas, Illinois
 Kansas, Indiana
 Kansas, Kentucky
 Kansas, Ohio
 Kansas, Oklahoma
 Kansas Lake, a lake in Minnesota
 Kansas River, a river in Kansas
 Kansasville, Wisconsin

Film and television
 Kansas (film), a 1988 film starring Matt Dillon and Andrew McCarthy
 "Kansas" (Farscape episode) 
 "Kansas" (Once Upon a Time), a third-season episode of the TV series Once Upon a Time
 Kansas, the main character played by Dennis Hopper in his 1971 film The Last Movie

Music
 Kansas (band), a progressive rock band
 Kansas (Kansas album), the 1974 self-titled debut album of the above band
 Kansas (Jennifer Knapp album), 1998 
 "Kansas", a 1988 song by post-punk band The Wolfgang Press
 "Kansas", a 2005 song from the film The Muppets' Wizard of Oz
 "Kansas", a 2011 song by The Devil Wears Prada from their album Dead Throne
 "Kansas", a 2012 song by Gucci Mane from his mixtape I'm Up
 "Kansas", a 2018 song by Gorillaz from their album The Now Now

Other
 USS Kansas, the name of two U.S. Navy ships
 3124 Kansas, an asteroid
 Rocky Kansas, an American boxer

See also
 
 Kansas City (disambiguation)
 Kansas City standard, a digital data storage standard for audio cassettes
 Kansas River, a river in northeastern Kansas
 Kansas Speedway, a speedway in Kansas City, Kansas
 University of Kansas, a university located in Lawrence, Kansas
 Kansas Jayhawks, the athletic program of the University of Kansas